Tsai Ming-liang (born 27 October 1957) is a Malaysian-Taiwanese filmmaker. Tsai has written and directed 11 feature films, many short films, and television films. He is one of the most celebrated "Second New Wave" film directors of Taiwanese cinema. His films have been acclaimed worldwide and have won numerous awards at festivals. In 1994, Tsai won the Golden Lion at the 51st Venice International Film Festival for the film Vive L'Amour.

Early life
Tsai was born in Malaysia, is of Chinese descent and spent his first 20 years in Kuching, Sarawak, after which he moved to Taipei, Taiwan. This, he said, had "a huge impact on [his] mind and psyche". "Even today", Tsai has said, "I feel I belong neither to Taiwan nor to Malaysia. In a sense, I can go anywhere I want and fit in, but I never feel that sense of belonging."

Tsai graduated from the Drama and Cinema Department of the Chinese Culture University of Taiwan in 1982 and worked as a theatrical producer, screenwriter, and television director in Hong Kong. From 1989 to 1991, he directed several telefilms. One of these, Boys, starred his muse, Lee Kang-sheng.

Career

1992–1998
Tsai's first feature film was Rebels of the Neon God (1992). A film about troubled youth in Taipei, it starred Lee as the character Hsiao-Kang. Lee went on to appear in all of Tsai's feature films through 2019. Tsai's second feature, Vive L'Amour (1994), is about three people who unknowingly share an apartment. The film is slow-paced, has little dialogue, and is about alienation; all of these became Tsai's trademarks. Vive L'Amour was critically acclaimed and won the Golden Horse Awards for best picture and best director.

Tsai's next film was The River (1997), in which a family has to deal with the son's neck pain. The family is similar to one that appears in Rebels of the Neon God and is played by the same three actors. The Hole (1998) is about two neighbors in an apartment. It features several musical numbers.

1999–2009
In Tsai's next film, What Time Is It There? (2001), a man and a woman meet in Taipei before the woman travels to Paris. This was Tsai's first film to star Chen Shiang-chyi, who starred in his next few films alongside Lee. Goodbye, Dragon Inn (2003) is about people inside an old cinema that is closing down. For this film, Tsai included even longer shots and fewer lines of dialogue than in previous films, a trend that continued in his later work. The Wayward Cloud (2005) is a sequel to What Time Is It There? in which Hsiao-Kang and Shiang-chyi meet again and start a relationship while Hsiao-Kang works as a pornographic film actor. This film, like The Hole, features several musical numbers.

Tsai's next film, I Don't Want to Sleep Alone (2006), was his first set in Malaysia and is about two different characters, both played by Lee. In 2007, the Malaysian Censorship Board banned the film based on incidents shown depicting the country "in a bad light" for cultural, ethical, and racial reasons, but later allowed it to be screened in the country after Tsai agreed to censor parts of the film according to the board's requirements. Tsai's next film, Face (2009), is about a Taiwanese director who travels to France to shoot a film.

2010–present

Tsai's next feature film was Stray Dogs (2013), about a homeless family. 

Most of Tsai's output in the 2010s was dedicated to his exhibition films, in particular the Walker series (2012-22), the subject of which was a monk played by Lee who travels by walking slowly, usually surrounded by a busy background.

In 2020, Tsai released Days, which competed for the Golden Bear at the Berlinale film festival.

In 2021, Tsai released Wandering, a short installation film with no dialogue, which follows a woman visiting an exhibition of Tsai's "Walker" series in Taiwan.

Honours
Tsai's honours include a Golden Lion (best picture) for Vive L'Amour at the 51st Venice International Film Festival; the Silver Bear – Special Jury Prize for The River at the 47th Berlin International Film Festival; the FIPRESCI award for The Hole at the 1998 Cannes Film Festival; and the Alfred Bauer Prize and Silver Bear for Outstanding Artistic Achievement for The Wayward Cloud at the 55th Berlin International Film Festival; the Grand Jury Prize at the 70th Venice International Film Festival for Stray Dogs. In 1995, he was a member of the jury at the 45th Berlin International Film Festival.

In 2003, The Guardian voted Tsai No. 18 of the 40 best directors in the world. In 2014, he was named an officer of the Order of Arts and Letters by the government of France.

Filmography

Feature films

"Walker" series

Other exhibition works

Segments

Documentaries

Telefilms

Casting
Tsai frequently recasts actors he has worked with on previous films:

References

External links

Tsai Ming-liang at Strictly Film School
AV Club interview
Asia Pacific Arts interview
Tsai Ming-liang on Tsai Ming-liang at Asia Society
Walking with Tsai Ming-liang and Lee Kang-sheng

1957 births
Living people
Chinese Culture University alumni
Malaysian people of Chinese descent
Malaysian film directors
Taiwanese film directors
LGBT film directors
Taiwanese gay men
People from Jieyang
People from Kuching
Malaysian emigrants to Taiwan
Officiers of the Ordre des Arts et des Lettres
Directors of Golden Lion winners
LGBT television directors